Eqaluit is a commune in southern Greenland.

The commune has its own peninsula, which contains Julianehåb granite, a granite formed in the Precambrian era, named after the Julianehåb (now Qaqortoq) district.

References

Qaqortoq
Granite formations